Consumption may refer to:

Resource consumption
Tuberculosis, an infectious disease, historically known as consumption
 Consumption (ecology), receipt of energy by consuming other organisms
 Consumption (economics), the purchasing of newly produced goods for current use also defined as the consuming of products
 Consumption function, an economic formula
 Consumption (sociology) of resources, associated with social class, identity, group membership, and age

See also
 
 Consumerism